Daniel Castro may refer to:
 Daniel Castro (baseball)
 Daniel Castro (archer)
 Daniel Castro (field hockey)
 Daniel Castro (footballer)